Boronia octandra is a plant in the citrus family, Rutaceae and is endemic to the south-west of Western Australia. It is a small shrub with three-part leaves and greenish cream to reddish brown, four-petalled flowers.

Description
The eight stamens are all fertile and alternate in length with those adjacent to the petals shorter than those adjacent to the sepals. Flowering occurs from June to October.

Taxonomy and naming
Boronia octandra was first formally described in 1971 by Paul Wilson and the description was published in Nuytsia from a specimen he collected west of Ravensthorpe. The specific epithet (octandra) mean "eight male", referring to the stamens.

Distribution and habitat
This boronia grows on undulating plains and breakaways in sandy soil. It is found between Gnowangerup and the West River in the Esperance Plains, Hampton and Mallee biogeographic regions.

Conservation status
Boronia octandra is classified as "not threatened" by the Department of Environment and Conservation (Western Australia).

References

octandra
Flora of Western Australia
Plants described in 1971
Taxa named by Paul G. Wilson